Jane Taylor (born July 19, 1972) is an English singer. She won the UK and International Song writing Competition in 2003 with her song Blowing This Candle Out.  Her second album, Compass, was awarded the Best Album title in the Folk / Singer-Songwriter category at the 2010 Independent Music Awards.

Career

Summary
Jane Taylor's debut album hit BBC national radio when Johnnie Walker decided to play the opening track from an album entitled Montpelier that he found on his desk, because he liked the cover (a charcoal sketch of her street which Jane had doodled herself).  The response from the listeners was enormous, highly unusual for an 'unknown' artist. Johnnie Walker played the track over 15 times despite it not actually being on the playlist and invited Taylor into the studio to perform a live session on the show.

Her first album Montpelier had been made on a shoestring, in a barn, with all manufacturing costs financed by pre-selling the album to her dedicated fan base (which she had home grown from the city of Bristol).  Taylor, producer Bill Lovelady and her band recorded the album in nine days in a freezing October.  Once it was made, she just posted it to BBC Radio 2 and crossed her fingers.

Because of the response to the airplay, she was invited into the BBC to perform a live session on the show.  From there she went on to support Jools Holland, Bill Wyman, Seth Lakeman, Paul Buchanan, Andy Fairweather Low and Paulo Nutini.  She secured a distribution deal, had "Fall on Me" played on MTV, and toured the UK and Germany, spreading the word and connecting her music to even more people.

Two years later, Taylor released her second album, Compass which was financially backed by two fans of her music whom Taylor now refers to as 'The Angels'. Taylor had never met her benefactors before, but they are now friends indeed.  She made the album with Mercury nominated producer Colin Elliot (famous for his work on the Richard Hawley albums) in Sheffield's Yellow Arch Studios.

The album featured the Grimethorpe Colliery Brass Band (who performed in the film Brassed Off), a gospel choir made up of some of the finest songwriters and musicians in Bristol and Bath, a rhythm track featuring everything from a rustling bin to the cellists impression of the sound of a dolphin, and classical string arrangements from her resident band Robin Davies, Bethany Porter and Feargus Heatherington.

Tracks from Compass received BBC Radio 2 airplay.  The album recently won an award for Best Album in the Folk / Singer-Songwriter category in the 2010 Independent Music Awards.

After taking some time out to give birth to her son, she booked a concert at St George's Hall, Bristol, which was sold out.  Taylor invited musicians to join her on stage including Lizz Lipscombe on violin, Robert Bray on percussion and uke, Robin Davies on double bass and Kate Robey on cello.  Other guests included marimba player Alphonse Daudet Touna, singer-songwriter Roger Tarry, The JT Brass Players (Andy Davies, Matt Davies and Chris Sanders) and the Barefoot Collective & Original Sing choirs.  The concert was a success and was voted one of the top three gigs in the Southwest for 2010 by Bristol's Venue Magazine. A recording of the concert was released as Live Album in November 2011.  In December 2011, Taylor released her new single "Oh December".

Taylor continues to create music with her band and tour under her own independent label Bicycle Records.  She is supported by her fan base, who in 2010 raised over £9000 to help her promote her work and fund her tours.

Quotes
"Without the people who buy my music and support the gigs and concerts I would never have got this far.  Being an independent artist, making the kind of music I do, and competing with the more commercial and larger labels can be fiercely overwhelming at times!  But then I'll get an incredible email from someone who's connected with the music or have the most wonderful feedback after a gig and I couldn't ever think about doing anything else!!"  Jane Taylor

"Classic, timeless song writing.  A quintessentially English Gem."  Time Out

"Beautiful."  Johnnie Walker, BBC Radio 2

"A very talented artist."  Bob Harris, BBC Radio 2

Biography

Growing up
Taylor was born in Lincolnshire in 1972, in an RAF hospital at Nocton Hall. As well as being in the RAF, her father was an artist, songwriter and guitarist. His musical talent and love of Bob Dylan, Joan Baez and Simon and Garfunkel influenced the young Jane, as did her mother's love of classical music.

She picked up her father's guitar at the age of five and composed her first song. Brought up in a village near Newark, Nottinghamshire, she attended Brownies and Sunday School at the local Church Hall. She continued to play the guitar and piano and composed throughout her childhood, winning school competitions and gaining a reputation for playing her music to the school.  At the age of 19, Jane went to Keele University, Staffordshire, where her music took on a political flavour.  In particular, a song entitled "Tiananmen Square" became a much-loved anthem for many of the students visiting the folk club there in the 1990s.

Early career
Following university, she landed a job in the music industry working for one of the few independents at the time, The Grapevine Label Ltd.  Grapevine had signed Emmylou Harris, Christy Moore, and Joan Baez. There she learned how to make and manufacture a record, and most importantly how to promote and sell a record..

Professional musician
In 2003, Taylor decided to give up her normal job and become a full-time singer-songwriter. A month later, she recorded her first single with Massive Attack guitarist Angelo Bruschini. The track was called "Blowing This Candle Out" and went on to win Best Song in the 'International Songwriter of the Year' competition, and landed Taylor her first major gig at Ronnie Scotts. She also went on to tour in Germany and Italy, gathering more fans along the way.

Sony TV requested permission to play the track "Getting To Me" (which was just a demo at the time) on the TV series Dawson's Creek. Taylor set up her own record label, Bicycle Records.

Montpelier (2006)
Together with Bill Lovelady, Taylor and her band created her first album Montpelier. When Johnnie Walker played the song "Fall on Me" on his BBC Radio 2 show in 2006, he was inundated with emails wanting to know who this new singer-songwriter was, where they could find out about her, and most importantly would he "Please play more". Walker invited Taylor to play a live session on his show.  Taylor has since appeared on the Radio 4 show Loose Ends, secured an international distribution deal with Pinnacle, had a track from the album included on The Word magazine, and landed support slots opening for Jools Holland, Bill Wyman, Paolo Nutini, Seth Lakeman, Midge Ure, Andy Fairweather-Low and Paul Buchanan of The Blue Nile.

Compass (2008)
Compass was released in 2008, with a number of special album preview shows in Scotland.  The first official launch was in Bristol's converted church, Circomedia. Shortly afterwards Taylor discovered she was pregnant, so plans for a re-release of the album were made for 2010.   Meanwhile, songs from the album have been played on the Bob Harris show on BBC Radio 2.

Get Rhythm said: "Jane Taylor is no ordinary singer songwriter. She has this intangible magic in her voice. The kind that draws you in and holds you right there until the moment you notice that you've forgotten to breathe and then you hear her words (which bizarrely seem to have been written for you), and stand there transfixed like it's a bit of fate that brought you here and I will defy anyone not to leave without a CD or at least humming one of her songs."

In January 2011, Compass won Best Album in the Singer-Songwriter Category at the 10th Annual Independent Music Awards.

Radio airplay
 BBC Radio 2 – The Bob Harris show.
 BBC Radio 2 – Johnnie Walker Drive Time.
 BBC Radio 2 – Johnnie Walker standing in for Terry Wogan.
 BBC Radio 4 – Loose Ends.
 BBC Radio 2 – Vanessa Feltz show.
 BBC Radio Scotland – Iain Anderson.

Jane Taylor live

2004
 New Bands Stage, Glastonbury.

2005
 Toured Ireland 2005.

2006
 Toured the UK.
 Main Stage, Trowbridge Pump Festival.
 Supported Seth Lakeman at Plymouth University.
 Supported Andy Fairweather-Low on his UK tour in October 2006.
 Supported Paul Buchanan of The Blue Nile on his UK tour in November 2006.
 Supported Paolo Nutini at The Cluny in Newcastle in December 2006.

2007
 Toured the UK.
 Supported Martha Tilston.
 Supported Jools Holland at the Larmer Tree Festival 2007.
 Supported Midge Ure in 2007.

2008
 Highlands Tour for Compass.
 UK launch tour for Compass.
 Glastonbury Festival.
 Trowbridge Pump Festival.
 Supported Bill Wyman of the Rolling Stones at The Robin 2 in Wolverhampton in 2008.
 Toured Germany in 2008.

2009
 Dartmouth Music Festival.
 Supported Ezio at The Robin 2, 26 August 2009.

2010
 St George's, Bristol.
 Colston Hall, Bristol.
 Toured Germany in 2010.

2011
 UK Winter Tour, with venues including:
 New Room, Bristol (John Wesley's Chapel)
 Lantern Theatre, Sheffield
 Salisbury Arts Centre

Discography

Barefoot EP (Bicycle Records Ltd, 2005, JT001)

Track listing
 Fall on Me
 Blowing This Candle Out
 I'm Fine
 16 Points
 Chef

Montpelier (Bicycle Records Ltd, 2006, JT002)

Track listing
 Fall on Me
 My Street
 Hit The Ground
 16 Points
 Chef
 Mirror Mirror
 Blowing This Candle Out
 Landslide
 Feels Good
 Brother
 Getting To Me

New Stuff We're Still Messing With EP (2007)

Track listing
 All Things Change
 Old Friends
 Cracks
 Home
 Hallelujah

Compass (Bicycle Records Ltd, 2009, JT003)

Track listing
 Cracks
 Hallelujah
 Old Friends
 All Things Change
 Compass
 Home
 I'm Fine
 Lay Down Your Sword
 Where Is Your Grace
 I Will Get There

The Live Album (Bicycle Records Ltd, 2011)

Track listing
 Home (with brass)
 Chef
 Compass
 The Spanish Song (with Roger Tarry)
 Cracks (with the choir)
 Lay Your Sword on the Ground
 The Rooster (with Alphonse)
 Hallelujah
 I'm Fine
 Where is your grace
 I Will Get There (with everyone)
 Fall on Me (encore)
 Crazy for the Boy (encore)

The Winter Single: Oh December (Bicycle Records Ltd, 2011)

Track listing
 "Oh December"
 "Violet"
 "Crazy For the Boy" (live)

References

External links
 Jane Taylor Official Website
 BBC Music: Jane Taylor
 BBC Bristol Introducing: Jane Taylor

1972 births
Living people
English women guitarists
English guitarists
English women pianists
English songwriters
21st-century English women singers
21st-century English singers
21st-century pianists
21st-century British guitarists
Musicians from Bristol
21st-century women guitarists
21st-century women pianists